Alexei Romanov may refer to:

 Alexis of Russia, Tsar of Russia from 1645 - 1676, son of Tsar Michael of Russia
 Alexei Nikolaevich, Tsarevich of Russia, heir to the throne of Russia, son of Tsar Nicholas II
 Alexei Petrovich, Tsarevich of Russia, son and heir of Peter the Great
 Grand Duke Alexei Alexandrovich of Russia, son of Tsar Alexander II
 Grand Duke Alexei Mikhailovich of Russia, grandson of Tsar Nicholas I
 Aleksey Romanov (politician) (1908–1998), a Soviet politician
Alexei Romanov, character in The Southern Vampire Mysteries